Clyde A. Lamb (May 13, 1899 – April 30, 1969) was an American football and basketball coach and college athletics administrator. He served as the head football coach at Ohio Northern University in Ada, Ohio in 1945 and from 1947 to 1954, compiling a record of 38–35–3. Lamb was also the head basketball coach at Ohio Northern for part of the 1945–46 season and from 1947 to 1949.

Head coaching record

Football

References

External links
 

1899 births
1969 deaths
Basketball coaches from Iowa
Coe Kohawks football players
Ohio Northern Polar Bears football coaches
Ohio Northern Polar Bears men's basketball coaches
People from Boone, Iowa
Players of American football from Iowa